Deux Rivières is a commune in the department of Yonne, central France.

Deux Rivières may also refer to:

 Canton of Deux Rivières et Vallées, Haute-Loire, France
 Deux-Rivières, Ontario, Canada

See also
 Les Deux Rives, a school in Mission, British Columbia, Canada
 Canton of Les Deux Rives, Tarn, France
 Dos Rios (disambiguation)
 Two Rivers (disambiguation)